State leaders in the 14th century BC – State leaders in the 12th century BC – State leaders by year

This is a list of state leaders in the 13th century BC (1300–1201 BC).

Africa: Northeast

Egypt: New Kingdom

Eighteenth Dynasty of the New Kingdom (complete list) –
Horemheb, King (1319–1292 BC)

Nineteenth Dynasty of the New Kingdom (complete list) –
Ramesses I, King (1292–1290 BC)
Seti I, King (1290–1279 BC)
Ramesses II, King (1279–1213 BC)
Merneptah, King (1213–1203 BC)
Amenmesses, Pharaoh (1203–1197 BC)
Seti II, Pharaoh (1201–1198 BC)

Asia

Asia: East

China

Shang, China (complete list) –
Yang Jia, King (c.1300 BC)
Pan Geng, King (c.1290–1263 BC)
Xiao Xin, King (c.1263–1260 BC)
Xiao Yi, King (c.1260–1250 BC)
Wu Ding, King (c.1250-1192 BC)

Asia: Southeast
Vietnam
Hồng Bàng dynasty (complete list) –
Giáp line, (c.1331–c.1252 BC)
Ất line, (c.1251–c.1162 BC)

Asia: West

Hittite: New Kingdom, Asia minor –
Mursili II, Ruler (c.1321–1295 BC, short chronology)
Muwatalli II, Ruler (c.1295–1272 BC, short chronology)
Mursili III a.k.a. Urhi-Teshub, (c.1272–1267 BC, short chronology)
Hattusili III, Ruler (c.1267–1237 BC, short chronology)
Tudhaliya IV, Ruler (c.1237–1209 BC, short chronology)
Arnuwanda III, Ruler (c.1209–1207 BC, short chronology)
Suppiluliuma II, Ruler (c.1207–1178 BC, short chronology)

Mitanni –
Shattuara Mittani becomes vassal of Assyria under Adad-nirari I
Wasashatta, King ( 000 )
Jiar, King ( 000 )
Shattiwaza Mitanni becomes vassal of the Hittite Empire
Shattuara Mittani becomes vassal of Assyria under Adad-nirari I
Wasashatta, King ( 000 )
Jiar, King ( 000 )

Ugarit, List  –
Niqmepa, King (c.1313–1260 BC)  Treaty with Mursili II of the Hittites
Ammittamru II, King (c.1260–1235 BC)  Contemporary of Bentisina of Amurru
Ibiranu, King (c.1235–1225/20 BC BC)
Niqmaddu III, King (c.1225/20 – 1215 BC)
Ammurapi, King (c.1200 BC BC)  Contemporary of Chancellor Bay

Tyre, Phoenecia –
Aribas, King (fl. c.1230 BC)
Baal-Termeg, King (fl. c.1220)

Assyria: Middle Assyrian Period
Arik-den-ili, King (c.1307–1296 BC, short chronology)
Adad-nirari I, King (c.1295–1264 BC, short chronology)
Shalmaneser I, King (c.1263–1234 BC, short chronology)

Kassite Dynasty, Third Dynasty of Babylon —
Nazi-Maruttash, King (c.1307–1282 BC), contemporary of Adad-nirari I of Assyria
Kadashman-Turgu, King (c.1281–1264 BC), contemporary of Hattusili III of the Hittites
Kadashman-Enlil II, King (c.1263–1255 BC), contemporary of Hattusili III of the Hittites
Kudur-Enlil, King (c.1254–1246 BC)
Shagarakti-Shuriash, King (c.1245–1233 BC)
Kashtiliashu IV, King (c.1232–1225 BC), contemporary of Tukulti-Ninurta I of Assyria
Enlil-nadin-shumi, Assyria installed governor (c.1224 BC)
Kadashman-Harbe II, Assyria installed governor (c.1223 BC)
Adad-shuma-iddina, Assyria installed governor (c.1222–1217 BC)
Adad-shuma-usur, King (c.1216–1187 BC), contemporary of Ashur-nirari III of Assyria

Elam: Igehalkid dynasty (complete list) –
Kidin-Hutran II, King (?)
Napirisha-Untash or Humban-Untash, King (?)
Pahir-Ishshan II, King (?)
Unpatar-Napirisha or Unpatar-Humban, King (?)
Kidin-Hutran III, King (c.1224–c.1217 BC)

References 

State Leaders
-
13th-century BC rulers